Andreas Thom (born 7 September 1965) is a German former professional footballer who played as a forward for BFC Dynamo, Bayer Leverkusen, Celtic and Hertha BSC. He played 51 times for East Germany throughout the 1980s and played ten times for the unified Germany national team in the early 1990s. He is now retired from playing and works as a youth coach at Hertha BSC.

Club career
 Andreas Thom was born in Rüdersdorf in East Germany and began playing football at an early age for TSG Herzfelde. Andreas Thom joined the youth department of BFC Dynamo in 1974 and enrolled in the elite Children and Youth Sports school (KJS) "Werner Seelenbinder" in Alt-Hohenschönhausen in Berlin. He began a sports teacher degree at the German University of Physical Culture (DHFK) in Leipzig in 1987.

Andreas Thom made his professional debut for BFC Dynamo in the DDR-Oberliga as a substitute for Bernd Schulz in the match against FC Carl Zeiss Jena on 22 October 1983. He then made his international debut for BFC Dynamo against FK Partizan Belgrade in the 1983-84 European Cup on 2 November 1983.  During his time at BFC Dynamo, he won the DDR-Oberliga in 1984, 1985, 1986, 1987 and 1988, and the FDGB-Pokal in 1988 and 1989. He scored the only goal of the game in the 1989 FDGB-Pokal final. Thom was the top scorer in the 1987-88 DDR-Oberliga. He became the player of the week six times during the league season. Thom was then also voted the East German Footballer of the Year in 1988.

On 16 December 1989, Thom became the first East German to sign for a Bundesliga club when he joined West German side Bayer Leverkusen for a transfer fee of 2.5 million Deutsche Mark (approx £900,000). The transfer also placed Thom amongst the highest earners in the Bundesliga and made him the highest paid player at Bayer Leverkusen. Thom made his historic debut for his new club on 17 February 1990, and scored the opening goal in a 3–1 win over FC Homburg. Thom spent over five years at Bayer Leverkusen, and picked up a winner's medal on 12 June 1993 win they defeated Hertha BSC II 1–0 in the final of the DFB-Pokal. Franz Beckenbauer has said that he thought Andreas Thom was the most complete player he had ever seen.

Thom signed for Glasgow club Celtic in July 1995 for a then club record fee of £2.2million. On 30 November 1997, Thom picked up another winner's medal when he played in the Celtic side that defeated Dundee United 3–0 in the Scottish League Cup Final. Thom moved back to Germany in January 1998 to sign for Hertha BSC, although his 15 league appearances for Celtic earlier that season saw him pick up a Scottish League championship medal when Celtic clinched the league title in May 1998.

Thom spent four years at Hertha BSC before retiring from playing. Thom made his last appearance on 7 March 2001, coming on as a substitute in a 2–1 win over SpVgg Unterhaching. In the 2000–01 season he foremost played in Hertha's reserve team.

International career
Thom played for the East Germany national team between 1984 and 1990, making 51 appearances and scoring 16 goals. He made his debut in a friendly against Algeria on 10 October 1984. He scored the first of his 16 international goals on 6 February 1985 in another friendly, a 3–2 win over Ecuador. Thom played in six of East Germany's qualifiers for the 1986 FIFA World Cup, and scored his first two competitive goals for his country on 28 September 1985 in a 2–1 win over Yugoslavia in Belgrade. East Germany, however, failed to qualify for the World Cup, finishing third in Group 4 behind France and Bulgaria. He was now a regular in the East German international side, and played in all eight of his nations qualifying ties for Euro 1988. He scored five goals over the campaign, including a hat-trick in a 6–0 away win over Iceland in June 1987. East Germany, however, again failed to qualify; finishing second in the group behind the Soviet Union.

In 1988, Thom took over from goalkeeper René Müller as captain of the national side for six matches, including their first two qualifying games for World Cup against Iceland and Turkey. He scored in both of these World Cup qualifiers, both goals in East Germany's 2–0 win over Iceland and their solitary goal in a 3–1 defeat against Turkey in Istanbul. Thom scored his last goal for East Germany on 8 October 1989 as his side came from a goal down to defeat the Soviet Union 2–1. That left the East Germans needing only a draw away against Austria to qualify for the World Cup. However, they were beaten 3–0 in that game and finished fourth in the qualifying group.

After the reunification of Germany, Thom made his debut for the unified team on 19 December 1990, the first match featuring players from the former East Germany: In a 4–0 win over Switzerland, he came on as a substitute for Matthias Sammer and scored within 30 seconds (Germany's third goal). He played in a further 9 matches and scored one more goal. He made his only appearance in the finals of a major international tournament in 1992 when he came on as a substitute for Stefan Effenberg in the final of Euro 1992 against Denmark (Germany lost 2–0).

Coaching career
After the sacking of Huub Stevens as head coach at Hertha BSC in December 2003, Thom briefly took over for 3 games until Hans Meyer was appointed later that month. Thom became assistant coach at the club and held that position under Meyer's successor, Falko Götz. On 10 April 2007, Thom was sacked along with Götz due to the poor performance of Hertha BSC.

On 15 December 2008, it was announced that Thom would become assistant coach at lower league Holstein Kiel in January 2009. Under head coach Falko Götz, Thom helped Holstein Kiel win promotion from the Regionalliga Nord to the national third division in 2009. On 15 February 2010, Holstein Kiel sacked Andreas Thom.

In the 2010–11 season, Thom was appointed to manage the Under-17 team of Hertha BSC. In the summer of 2017, new head coach at Hertha BSC, Pál Dárdai, brought Thom into a coaching role with the first team, specialising in coaching the strikers at the club.

Honours
Berliner FC Dynamo
 DDR-Oberliga: 1984, 1985, 1986, 1987, 1988
 FDGB Pokal: 1988, 1989
 DFV-Supercup: 1989

Bayer Leverkusen
 DFB-Pokal: 1993

Celtic
 Scottish League champion: 1998
 Scottish League Cup: 1997

Germany
 UEFA European Championship: Runner-up 1992

Individual
 East German Footballer of the Year: 1988

References

External links
 
 
 

1965 births
Living people
People from Märkisch-Oderland
Footballers from Brandenburg
Association football forwards
German footballers
East German footballers
Germany international footballers
Berliner FC Dynamo players
Bayer 04 Leverkusen players
Hertha BSC players
Celtic F.C. players
Expatriate footballers in Scotland
UEFA Euro 1992 players
Hertha BSC managers
Bundesliga players
Scottish Football League players
East Germany international footballers
East Germany under-21 international footballers
Dual internationalists (football)
German expatriate footballers
DDR-Oberliga players
German football managers
People from Bezirk Frankfurt
German expatriate sportspeople in Scotland